Arthur Koestler  is a book by Mark Levene published in 1984, a year after Arthur Koestler's suicide. The book is divided into seven main chapters, of which the first of is a biography and the other six critical essays on each of Koestler's six novels, his stories and his play Twilight Bar.

The book, which measures 200 mm x 120 mm (small format) was published by Frederick Ungar Publishing Co. in New York, 1984, and by Oswald Wolff (Publishers) in London, 1985,  (cloth);  (paperback).

Contents
Chronology [of Koestler's life], (pages ix–xv)

The Koestler Life: An Arrow in the Twentieth Century (pages 1–32)

Silhouettes of History:  The Gladiators (pages 33–54)

The Mind on Trial: Darkness at Noon (pages 55–77)

Therapy, Aesthetics, and the Divine: Arrival and Departure  (pages 78–95)

Old Means and New Ends: Thieves in the Night (pages 96–112)

The Pathology of Faith: The Age of Longing  and Twilight Bar  (pages 113–132)

Doubts and Fatigue: The Call Girls  and Five Stories (pages 133–148)

Conclusion (pages 149–151)

Notes (pages 152–164)

Bibliography (pages 166–171)

Index (pages 172–176)

Arthur Koestler
1984 non-fiction books
American biographies
British biographies
Biographies about writers
Books of literary criticism